Maximilianos was the first Greek-built steamship, completed in 1837 at the Poros Naval Shipyard. It was named after the then Crown Prince and future King Maximilian II of Bavaria, the elder brother of Greece's first king, Otto. It was an unarmed, 180-ton steamer used for auxiliary naval duties and mail service. The Poros Naval Shipyard undertook construction of a large number of ships for the Greek Navy until the 1880s, when Greece's main naval base was transferred to Salamis.

References
 

Steamships of Greece
Ships built in Greece
1837 ships
Auxiliary ships of the Hellenic Navy